This article focuses on the part of the Alps and Pré-Alps that is located in North-Eastern Switzerland and compromises the Schwyzer Alps and the Appenzell Alps. This region is bordered by: Lake Lucerne in the south-west; the Klausen Pass, upper Linth valley and Lake Walen in the south; the Rhine valley in the east; Lake Constance in the north.

Peaks
Some of the chief peaks of the Swiss (Pre-)Alps, north of the Klausen Pass, are:

Passes

The chief passes of the Swiss Alps, north of the Klausen Pass, are:
Note: road status .

See also
Central Eastern Alps
Glarus Alps

Mountain ranges of Switzerland
Mountain ranges of the Alps
Landforms of the canton of St. Gallen
Landforms of the canton of Schwyz